Igor Vitalyevich Osinkin (born 4 June 1965) is a Russian professional football coach and a former player. He manages PFC Krylia Sovetov Samara.

Coaching career
As a youth coach, he coached Alan Kusov and Alan Dzagoev, who grew up to play for the Russia national football team.

On 28 July 2020, he joined PFC Krylia Sovetov Samara. He led the team to promotion to the Russian Premier League and also to the final of the 2020–21 Russian Cup in his first season at the helm. On 23 June 2021, he extended his contract with Krylia Sovetov for three more seasons.

External links

References

1965 births
Living people
Soviet footballers
Russian footballers
Russian football managers
FC Kuban Krasnodar managers
Russian Premier League managers
Association football midfielders
FC Spartak Vladikavkaz players
PFC Krylia Sovetov Samara managers
FC Dynamo Makhachkala players